Standard Yarn Company Building is a historic factory building located at Oswego in Oswego County, New York.  It is a brick structure, measuring 200 feet along the street and constructed in three sections between 1897 and 1911.  It is of common mill construction with load bearing masonry walls and wooden floors and joists supported by heavy wooden posts.

It was listed on the National Register of Historic Places in 2008.

References

Industrial buildings and structures on the National Register of Historic Places in New York (state)
Industrial buildings completed in 1911
Buildings and structures in Oswego County, New York
1911 establishments in New York (state)
National Register of Historic Places in Oswego County, New York
Textile mills in New York (state)
Yarn